Araya is a 1959 Venezuelan documentary film directed by Margot Benacerraf and co-written by Benacerraf and Pierre Seghers.

Plot 
The film depicts the lives of labourers who extract salt from the sea off the Araya Peninsula in Venezuela. Their method for extracting salt, virtually unchanged for centuries, depends on gruelling physical labor, but provides a dependable, if meagre, living for the men and their families. The film ends with a recently built plant for mechanised salt extraction that could eliminate the community's traditional source of income.

Filming 
Araya was produced by a two-person crew consisting of Margot Benacerraf and her cameraman Giuseppe Nisoli. On arriving at the arid and barren landscape of the Araya peninsula on the north coast of Venezuela Benacerraf remarked it was like "arriving on the moon". Although colour photography was available to Benacerraf and Nisoli, the decision was made to shoot in black and white, as it was deemed a more powerful way of portraying the subjects.

The soundtrack to Araya includes sounds from the sea, remixed in diverse ways including playing in reverse. Benacerraf noted that the Andalusian polos songs, rare in Venezuela, had lasted due to the extreme isolation of the Araya community.

Reception 
The film was entered into the 1959 Cannes Film Festival, where it shared the Cannes International Critics Prize with Alain Resnais's Hiroshima mon amour. The audience at Cannes doubted Benacerraf's claim that the film was shot by a two-man crew, especially due to the dramatic shots from a crane.  However Benacerraf responded that they had merely made use of a vacant crane left at the mine.

In 2009, Milestone Films released Araya in North American theaters for the first time as well as rereleasing it internationally. Milestone also distributes a restored DVD version of the film.

References

External links
 Araya: Distributor Milestone Film's official site for the film

 

1959 films
French black-and-white films
Venezuelan black-and-white films
1950s Spanish-language films
1959 documentary films
French documentary films
Venezuelan documentary films
Documentary films about Venezuela
Black-and-white documentary films
1950s French films